Chandaluru is a beautiful village in the Prakasam district of the Indian state of Andhra Pradesh. Chandaluru village has great historical importance and developed recently. This village was well known for communist movements and protests against inequality and justice. There are many leaders who raised voice, but Comrade Rayani Veeraiah was a noted national communist revolutionary all his life and stood for the exploited and oppressed. Veeraiah born in 1935, was part left student movement, was in CPI, in CPIM from 1964 to 1967, with APCCCR in 1968–69, and joined CPIML led by comrade Charu Majumdar in 1969 along with Kolla Venkaiah garu. He breathed last as a prominent leader of the M-L Committee on 22-06-2000 in Guntur after giving a representation to the authority on the plight of tobacco growers. He ardently cooperated with Kolla Venkaiah in the formation of GPS in 1980 and did yeoman work on the land to the tiller, on housing to the poor, lift irrigation, remunerative prices to peasants agriculture products questions. His work spread over more than 30 villages in Prakasam and Guntur districts. On his memorial, a stupa was built in Chandaluru and Ravinutala village by his followers and was remembered on every June 22 and labors day, organized by Grameena Pedala Sangham (Rural Poor Association).

This village has great historical importance with valuable temples built by Cholas and Krishna devaraya. One of the prominent temples with ancient significance is Chennakesava Temple. Every year, probably one or two days, the sun rays directly touch the foot of the chennakesava idol which is located at the heart of the temple. Shivalayam in this village also has great historical importance of 3000 years. This temple is present at the center of the lake surrounded by water. Siva lingam in this temple was swayambu. Great Mahalakshmi ammavaru kolupulu in this village is a special attraction. These are held with great devotion and a lot of crowd is seen at the temple during Sankranti festival time. Cultural activities are held every day.
                            
A great place with great personalities, good relations among the people. Honourable sarpanch Rayani Kesavarao, with great determination undertake the development of the village on his hands with the help of eminent men in the village. This village is developed well and it is so beautiful with greenery.

References 
http://www.cpiml.in/cms/articles-news-statements-2/news-reports/item/1544-ap-comrade-rayani-veeraiah-remembered

Villages in Prakasam district
Mandal headquarters in Prakasam district